The Opera Singer is a 1932 Italian musical film directed by Nunzio Malasomma and starring Gianfranco Giachetti, Germana Paolieri and Isa Pola.

Cast
 Gianfranco Giachetti as Papussa  
 Germana Paolieri as Lina  
 Isa Pola as Lisetta  
 Alfredo Moretti as George  
 Ugo Ceseri as Ravelli  
 Gino Viotti as Singing Master  
 Alfredo Martinelli 
 Emilio Baldanello 
 Cesira Vianello 
 Giovanni Casati 
 Giselda Gasperini 
 Carmen Baird 
 Gastone Ror 
 Remo Brignardelli

References

Bibliography 
 Ricci, Steven. Cinema and Fascism: Italian Film and Society, 1922–1943. University of California Press, 2008.

External links 
 

1932 musical films
Italian musical films
1932 films
1930s Italian-language films
Films directed by Nunzio Malasomma
Italian black-and-white films
1930s Italian films